A lignocolous lichen is a lichen that grows on wood that has the bark stripped from it. This is to be compared to a corticolous lichen that grows on bark, and saxicolous lichens that grow on rock.

References

Lichenology